Chesias is a genus of moths in the family Geometridae described by Treitschke in 1825.

Selected species
 Chesias angeri Schawerda, 1919
 Chesias capriata Prout, 1904
 Chesias isabella Schawerda, 1915
 Chesias legatella (Denis & Schiffermüller, 1775) – the streak
 Chesias linogrisearia Constant, 1888
 Chesias rhegmatica Prout, 1937
 Chesias rufata (Fabricius, 1775) – broom-tip

References